Henry Seymour may refer to:

New Zealand
Henry Seymour (New Zealand politician) (1796–1883), member of the New Zealand Legislative Council

United Kingdom
Henry Seymour (16th-century MP) (1503–1578), Member of Parliament (MP) for Hampshire in 1547, brother of Queen Jane Seymour and uncle of Edward VI of England
Henry Seymour (Langley) (1612–1687), friend of Charles II and MP for East Looe
Henry Seymour (died 1728), English MP
Henry Seymour (Redland) (1729–1807), MP for Totnes, Huntingdon, Evesham, lover of Madame du Barry
Henry Seymour (Knoyle) (1776–1849), MP for Taunton
Henry Seymour, 9th Marquess of Hertford (born 1958), British peer
Henry Seymour, Lord Beauchamp (1626–1654), English nobleman
Lord Henry Seymour (naval commander), English admiral who fought the Spanish Armada
Lord Henry Seymour (politician) (1746–1830), MP for Coventry, Midhurst, Downton
Sir Henry Seymour, 1st Baronet (1674–1714), MP for East Looe
Henry Danby Seymour (1820–1877), MP for Poole
Henry Seymour (Royal Navy officer) (1818–1869), naval commander and politician
Henry Seymour (secularist) (1861–1938), secularist, anarchist and gramophone innovator

United States
Henry W. Seymour (1834–1906), U.S. Representative for Michigan
Henry Seymour (Commissioner) (1780–1837), New York politician

Other
Henry Seymour (pastoralist) (1799–1869), Irish lawyer migrated to South Australia 1840